Toab may refer to:
Toab, Orkney, Scotland
Toab, Shetland, Scotland

See also
Tetraoctylammonium bromide (TOAB)
Toabré (disambiguation)